Rachel Jeffers (born April 20, 1985) is an American rower. In the 2007 World Rowing Championships, she won a gold medal in the women's coxless four event. She also won a bronze medal at the 2006 World Rowing Championships in the same event.

References

See also

American female rowers
World Rowing Championships medalists for the United States
Living people
1985 births
21st-century American women